KEYE or Keye may refer to:

 KEYE-TV, a television station (channel 34, virtual 42) licensed to Austin, Texas, United States
 KEYE (AM), a radio station (1400 AM) licensed to Perryton, Texas
 KEYE-FM, a radio station (93.7 FM) licensed to Perryton, Texas
 The ICAO airport code for Eagle Creek Airpark
 Keye, an alternate name for Kévé, Togo